Rusumo International Bridge is an international bridge, opened in 2014, across the Kagera River. It replaces the previous single lane Rusomo Bridge linking Rwanda and Tanzania. The project was funded by the Japan International Cooperation Agency.

References

Buildings and structures under construction in Tanzania
Bridges over the Kagera River
Rwanda–Tanzania bridges
Bridges in Rwanda
Bridges in Tanzania
Japan International Cooperation Agency